John J. Eklund is a former Republican member of the Ohio Senate for the 18th district. He was appointed in November 2011 to replace Tim Grendell, who was appointed as a judge in Geauga County. The selection committee considered thirteen candidates for the appointment. He is the Chairman of the Senate Criminal Justice Committee. Eklund then went on to win the 2012 election for a full-term, winning with 54.7% of the vote. His district includes all of Portage County along with half of Lake County and most of Geauga County.

Career 
Eklund joined law firm Calfee, Halter & Griswold in 1980, and became a partner in 1988. He specialises in antitrust law. Eklund has a law degree from Washington and Lee University School of Law and a bachelor's degree from Union College. He is married with two children.

References

External links
John J. Eklund at Calfee, Halter & Griswold
Campaign website

Living people
Republican Party Ohio state senators
Washington and Lee University School of Law alumni
Union College (New York) alumni
Year of birth missing (living people)
21st-century American politicians